Joseph Thomin (30 June 1931 – 16 December 2018) was a French professional road bicycle racer, who won one stage of the 1956 Tour de France.

Major results

1956
Avignon
Le Bouguin
Tour de France:
Winner stage 15
1958
Bannalec
Landivisiau
Saint-Thégonnec
Tour de Picardie
1960
Brest
Châteaugiron
Lesneven
1961
Callac
Châteaugiron
Dinan
Plonéour-Lavern
Quimperlé
Saint-Thégonnec
1962
La Bouexiére
Plougasnou
1963
Callac
Juliénas
Brest
1964
Circuit des genêts verts (with Jean Bourles)
Plouëc-du-Trieux
1965
Pluvigner
Plessala

References

External links 

Official Tour de France results for Joseph Thomin

1931 births
2018 deaths
French male cyclists
French Tour de France stage winners
Sportspeople from Finistère
Cyclists from Brittany